The 2013–14 season was Cardiff City Football Club's first season in the Premier League, and their first in the top division of English football since the 1961–62 season. This ended ten consecutive years in the Football League second division. Overall, it was their 16th season competing in England's top division.

Kit

|
|
|

Premier League

League table

Results summary

Results by matchday

First Team Squad

Statistics

|-
|colspan="14"|Players currently out on loan:

|-
|colspan="14"|Players featured for club who have left:

|}

Captains

Goalscorers

Disciplinary record

Suspensions served

Contracts

Transfers

In

 Total spending:  ~ £36,000,000+
Notes
1 Although officially undisclosed, Wales Online believed the deal to be worth around £2 million.

Out

 Total income:  ~ £Undisclosed
Notes

Loans Out

Fixtures and results

Pre-season

2013–14 Premier League

FA Cup

League Cup

Overall summary

Summary

Score overview

Development Squad

Under 21 Premier League Group 2

Under 21 FA Cup

Club staff

Backroom staff

Board of directors

References

External links
 
 
 

2013-14
Welsh football clubs 2013–14 season
2013–14 Premier League by team